Apamauta lineolata is a species of beetle in the family Cerambycidae, and the only species in the genus Apamauta. It was described by Thomson in 1868.

References

Onciderini
Beetles described in 1868